Tobacco River may refer to:

 The Tobacco River (Keweenaw County, Michigan), on the Upper Peninsula of Michigan in the United States
 The Tobacco River (Tittabawassee River), on the Lower Peninsula of Michigan in the United States